Dominic Joseph Elioff (born March 7, 1931) is an American politician in the state of Minnesota. He served in the Minnesota House of Representatives from 1979–1986.

References

1931 births
Living people
People from Virginia, Minnesota
Democratic Party members of the Minnesota House of Representatives